Anjou station is a commuter rail station operated by Exo in the borough of Rivière-des-Prairies–Pointe-aux-Trembles in Montreal, Quebec, Canada. 

It is served by the Mascouche line and by VIA Rail's Montreal–Jonquière and Montreal–Senneterre trains.

The station is located immediately northeast of Quebec Autoroute 25 in an industrial area between Boulevard Henri-Bourassa Est and Boulevard Maurice-Duplessis. It is in fact located a short distance outside the boundaries of the borough of Anjou. The station, built on an embankment, possesses two low-level side platforms: platform 1 on the north side and platform 2, which is shorter, on the south side. Platform 1 is primarily used by the Mascouche commuter train and platform 2 by VIA. Both platforms are wheelchair accessible and feature raised wheelchair platforms with ramps to provide access to the trains.

Platform 1 opens via a staircase onto 8e Rue, and also features a headhouse providing stair and escalator access to the platform and to a tunnel under the tracks. This in turn leads to another headhouse on the south side, serving the station's parking lot. The tunnel does not provide direct access to platform 2, which is reached via a staircase and ramp from the parking lot. The parking lot and kiss-and-ride loop are reached from Boulevard Henri-Bourassa. 

An artwork by Pierre Blanchette entitled Entrain consists of a set of brightly coloured graphics installed on the windows of the upper level of the north-side headhouse.

Connecting bus routes

References

External links
 Anjou Commuter Train Station Information (RTM)
 Anjou Commuter Train Station Schedule (RTM)
 2016 STM System Map

Exo commuter rail stations
Anjou, Quebec
Railway stations in Quebec